Catherine Perry may refer to:

 Catherine Joy Perry (born 1985) U.S. female pro-wrestler, with the stagename Lana
 Catherine D. Perry (born 1952) U.S. judge

See also
 Katherine Perry (1897-1983) U.S. actress
 Katie Jane Perry (born 1980) Australian fashion designer
 Katy Perry (born 1984) U.S. pop singer
 Perry (disambiguation)